Fest may refer to:
 Fest, Danish/German/Norwegian/Swedish/Breton for party
 Fest, a type of festival
 The Fest, music festival in Gainesville, Florida
 Joachim Fest (1926–2006), German historian and journalist
 Fest Magazine, is an Edinburgh Festival review magazine
 Fest, a fictional planet in the Star Wars franchise

FEST may refer to:
 FEST (Faculty of Moscow State Forest University)
 Federation of Engineering and Shipbuilding Trades
 FEST (film festival), an annual film festival in Belgrade, Serbia
 Foreign Emergency Support Team, a U.S. government short-notice anti-terrorism unit

See also
 
 
 Festschrift, a book honoring a respected person, especially an academic, presented during his or her lifetime
 Festuca, a genus of about 300 species of perennial tufted grasses, belonging to the grass family Poaceae (subfamily Pooideae)